The following highways are numbered 41:

International
 Asian Highway 41
 European route E41

Australia
 Olympic Highway
 Mid-Western Highway

Canada
 Alberta Highway 41
 British Columbia Highway 41
 Manitoba Highway 41
 Newfoundland and Labrador Route 41
 Ontario Highway 41
 Saskatchewan Highway 41

India
  National Highway 41 (India)

Iran
 Road 41

Israel
Highway 41 (Israel)

Japan
 Japan National Route 41
 Noetsu Expressway
 Tōkai-Hokuriku Expressway

Korea, South
 National Route 41

New Zealand
 New Zealand State Highway 41

Norway
 Norwegian National Road 41

Poland 
 Autostrada A41 - former short motorway near Kraków (1999-2003/2004)
  National road 41

United Kingdom
 British A41 (Birkenhead-London)

United States
 Interstate 41
 U.S. Route 41
 U.S. Route 41W (Georgia–Tennessee) (former)
 U.S. Route 41W (Tennessee–Kentucky) (former)
 U.S. Route 41E (Georgia) (former)
 U.S. Route 41E (Georgia–Tennessee) (former)
 U.S. Route 41E (Tennessee–Kentucky) (former)
 Alabama State Route 41
 Arkansas Highway 41
 California State Route 41
 County Route J41 (California)
 Colorado State Highway 41
 Connecticut Route 41
 Delaware Route 41
 Florida State Road 41
 County Road 41 (Pasco County, Florida)
 Georgia State Route 41
 Idaho State Highway 41
 Illinois Route 41
 Iowa Highway 41 (former)
 K-41 (Kansas highway)
 Louisiana Highway 41
 Louisiana State Route 41 (former)
 Maine State Route 41
 Maryland Route 41
 Massachusetts Route 41
 M-41 (Michigan highway) (former)
 Minnesota State Highway 41
 Mississippi Highway 41
 Missouri Route 41
 Montana Highway 41
 Nebraska Highway 41
 Nebraska Link 41D
 Nebraska Spur 41B
 Nebraska Spur 41C
 Nevada State Route 41 (former)
 New Hampshire Route 41
 New Jersey Route 41
 County Route 41 (Bergen County, New Jersey)
 New Mexico State Road 41
 New York State Route 41
 County Route 41 (Allegany County, New York)
 County Route 41 (Dutchess County, New York)
 County Route 41 (Erie County, New York)
 County Route 41 (Essex County, New York)
 County Route 41 (Genesee County, New York)
 County Route 41 (Greene County, New York)
 County Route 41 (Livingston County, New York)
 County Route 41 (Madison County, New York)
 County Route 41 (Onondaga County, New York)
 County Route 41 (Ontario County, New York)
 County Route 41 (Orleans County, New York)
 County Route 41 (Putnam County, New York)
 County Route 41 (Rensselaer County, New York)
 County Route 41 (Rockland County, New York)
 County Route 41 (Schoharie County, New York)
 County Route 41 (St. Lawrence County, New York)
 County Route 41 (Steuben County, New York)
 County Route 41 (Suffolk County, New York)
 County Route 41 (Sullivan County, New York)
 County Route 41 (Tioga County, New York)
 County Route 41 (Ulster County, New York)
 North Carolina Highway 41
 North Dakota Highway 41
 Ohio State Route 41
 Pennsylvania Route 41
 South Carolina Highway 41
 South Carolina Highway 41 (1920s) (former)
 South Carolina Highway 41 (1930s) (former)
 South Dakota Highway 41 (former)
 Tennessee State Route 41
 Texas State Highway 41
 Farm to Market Road 41
 Texas State Highway Spur 41 (former)
 Texas Park Road 41
 Utah State Route 41 (former)
 Virginia State Route 41
 Virginia State Route 41 (1923-1933) (former)
 Washington State Route 41
 West Virginia Route 41
 Wisconsin Highway 41 (former)

Territories
 Puerto Rico Highway 41

Thailand
  Thailand Route 41

See also
A41 (disambiguation)#Roads
List of highways numbered 41A
Route 41 (King County Metro)